Westwind is a 1975-1976 young adult television action drama on the NBC Saturday morning line up. The show chronicled the adventures of the Andrews family as they sailed the ocean on their yacht. It ran for one season with a total of 13 episodes produced.

Premise
The show was named for the twin masted yacht, Westwind. The plot of the show concentrated on a scientist/photographer couple and their two teenage children sailing around the islands of the Pacific, finding danger and adventure.

Cast
The cast included:
Van Williams as Steve Andrews
Niki Dantine as Kate Andrews
Steve Burns as Tom Andrews
Kimberly Beck as Robin Andrews
Thomas Asinsin as Keoki

John Carradine appeared in two episodes as Captain Hooks.

Production
The show was known for its lush photography on land and underwater by Lamar Borem. Borem was the photographer for the television series Flipper. The show was filmed in Hawaii and its introduction was narrated by voice actor Paul Frees. The show was produced by William P. D'Angelo Productions, who were responsible for another NBC live-action children's drama, Run, Joe, Run. The show did moderately well in terms of ratings but was canceled because of high production costs as compared to the standard production cost of the other Saturday morning shows.

Network censors demanded that no cleavage should be shown by girls wearing bikinis. The show's producers added inserts to the bikini tops that ended up drawing more attention to the girls' chests.

Episodes

References

External links
 
 TV Party

1970s American children's television series
1975 American television series debuts
1976 American television series endings
NBC original programming
American children's action television series
Television shows filmed in Hawaii
Television shows set in Hawaii
English-language television shows